The term "America’s Team" is a nickname that refers to the National Football League (NFL)'s Dallas Cowboys. The nickname originated with the team's 1978 highlight film, where the narrator (John Facenda) opens with the following introduction: The term is recognized and often used by media outlets, including ESPN, Yahoo!, HBO, and Sports Illustrated.

History
Bob Ryan, now Vice President and editor-in-chief of NFL Films, coined this for the Cowboys while preparing and editing the team's 1978 season highlight film. He was quoted as saying:

Ryan told the NFL Network for their Top Ten Nicknames show:
 
During the Cowboys' first game of the 1979 season, a nationally televised game against the St. Louis Cardinals (Dallas won 22–21), the television announcer Pat Summerall for CBS introduced the Cowboys as America's Team and the name stuck.

Dallas's Hall of Fame coach Tom Landry originally did not approve of the appellation of America's Team. He felt that it would give opposing teams extra incentive to play harder. Eventually he gave in and actually came to like the name. The nickname was coined at the height of Landry's NFL-record 20 consecutive winning season streak, during which Dallas appeared in 12 conference championship games (counting the 1966 and 1967 league championships) and five Super Bowls, and was exemplified on the field by the iconic Hall of Fame quarterback Roger Staubach, but the team's popularity has continued over the decades during periods of both mediocrity and dynastic success.

Records and media

In 2003, NFL Films released a DVD collection chronicling the Dallas Cowboys franchise entitled The Dallas Cowboys: The Complete History of America's Team 1960–2003. In 2008, NFL Films would release an updated DVD of The History of the Dallas Cowboys.

The popularity of the Cowboys as America's Team has been supported by such NFL records as "Team with Most Consecutive Sold Out Games", a streak of 160 home and away games (including playoffs) that began on December 23, 1990, at Philadelphia's Veterans Stadium and came to an end on December 24, 1999, in a Christmas Eve game against the New Orleans Saints in the Louisiana Superdome. Other examples are the NFL games featuring the Cowboys that result in record-breaking ratings at the time of broadcast, such as 7 of the 8 Super Bowl games featuring the Cowboys and the NFC Championship Game between the Cowboys and 49ers, the only non-Super Bowl NFL game to be ranked in the Top 45 Primetime Telecasts of All Time. Dallas is the only NFL team that distributes its own merchandise, which remains among the league's top selling even during losing seasons. As of 2012 the Cowboys were the most valuable American sports franchise at $2.1 billion.  Among the many Cowboys innovations that have contributed to their distinct reputation are their professional, overtly beautiful, all female cheerleader squad, nicknamed "America's Sweethearts", that has since been copied around the NFL but still stands out as singularly iconic, and has been the subject of multiple movies, has made numerous national television appearances, routinely tours with the USO, makes other appearances around the world, and has been featured in its own long running reality show on CMT.

In 2012 an ESPN poll found that the Cowboys are the most popular NFL team, a result consistently echoed in annual Harris polling.

Other uses
Franchises with long successful histories and large nationwide fan bases are occasionally referred to as America's Team.

The Atlanta Braves laid claim to the name due to their games being broadcast on cable television systems nationwide on TBS from 1977 to 2007, building a fan base in areas of the United States far removed from a Major League Baseball team.  A 1982 issue of Sports Illustrated had referred to the Braves as "America's Team II".

As a jab against the Cowboys before Super Bowl XXVII, Buffalo Bills coach Marv Levy proclaimed his team to be America's Team because they would be "wearing red, white, and blue". The Cowboys, whose team colors are navy blue, silver and white, went on to defeat the Bills 52–17.

Pittsburgh Steelers owner Art Rooney dismissed the suggestion that the Steelers were "America's Team." " 'We didn't want that,' Rooney said. 'We're Pittsburgh's team. We feel strongly about that.' "

In a 2009 ESPN.com article titled, "The Great Debate: 'America's Team'," four sports writers stated their case as to why three other teams besides the Cowboys could lay claim to the nickname of America's Team.

James Walker said the name should be given to the Pittsburgh Steelers since they have the most Super Bowl wins at six.
Kevin Seifert said that the Green Bay Packers could be considered America's Team due to their unique ownership situation. They "are now owned by 112,120 shareholders who possess about 4.75 million shares of stock. A seven-member executive committee, elected by the board of directors and  mostly of local residents, operates the team."
Tim Graham said the New England Patriots have a right at the name since they dominated the NFL for the entire first decade of the new millennium, by virtue of their team name and colors (red, white and blue) and having been formed in Boston, the "Cradle of Liberty".

Following their win in Super Bowl XLIV, a few media writers referred to the New Orleans Saints as "America's Team", as their successful bid to win the Super Bowl was seen by many to represent the city's resurgence after the devastation of Hurricane Katrina ("for one game, the Saints are America's Team").

After several "Cinderella" runs in the NCAA tournament, the Gonzaga Bulldogs men's basketball team has been called "America's Team" as well.

During their ArenaBowl XXII championship run in 2008, Philadelphia Soul owner Ron Jaworski referred to the Soul as "America's Team" of the Arena Football League.

During their 2020 season, Coastal Carolina Head Coach Jamey Chadwell referred to the Chanticleers as America's team.

References

External links
 Dallas Cowboys official web site
  (via NFL Films)

Dallas Cowboys
Nicknamed groups of American football players